Damià Campeny i Estrany (12 April 1771, Mataró - 17 July 1855, Barcelona) was a Spanish sculptor in the Classical style.

Biography
He was born to the shoemaker, Andreu Campeny, and his wife Casilda. His first studies were at a private Catholic school. After completing his primary education, he studied at the Escola de la Llotja in Barcelona. He then opened his own studio; receiving commissions for religious sculptures from several local parishes.

In 1797, he was awarded a stipend from the Board of Trade, to continue his studies in Rome. There, he became acquainted with the famous sculptor, Antonio Canova, and spent eighteen years at the Vatican workshops, creating sculptures on mythological themes; such as Hercules and Neptune. Many of his works were sent back home, to the Board of Trade.

When he returned to Barcelona, he became a Professor at his alma mater, the Escola, and was named Director of the sculpture department in 1819. He was also  offered a Professorship at the Real Academia de Bellas Artes de San Fernando, which he declined, and a position as Court Sculptor for King Ferdinand VII, which he accepted. His other appointments include that of Academician at the Escola de Sant Lluís, in Zaragoza, and the Real Academia de Bellas Artes de San Carlos de Valencia. He became one of the first teachers at what is now the Reial Acadèmia Catalana de Belles Arts de Sant Jordi in 1850, despite questions about his age and health. 

Numerous disputes regarding his salary, and payments for his sculptures, left him in near poverty. His health worsened and he died, from "senile dysentery", at his home in Sant Gervasi de Cassoles, now part of Barcelona.

His works may be found at MNAC, the Reial Acadèmia Catalana de Belles Arts de Sant Jordi, and the Biblioteca Museu Víctor Balaguer in Vilanova i la Geltrú, among others. In 1999, a retrospective was held at the Museu Frederic Marès.

Selected works

References

Further reading 
 Carlos Cid Priego, La vida y la obra del escultor neoclásico catalán Damià Campeny i Estrany, Biblioteca de Catalunya-Caixa Laietana, 1998

External links 

 Brief biography @ MNAC
 Works by Campeny @ the Reial Acadèmia Catalana de Belles Arts de Sant Jordi

1771 births
1855 deaths
Spanish sculptors
Sculptors from Catalonia
People from Mataró
Neoclassical sculptures
Burials at Poblenou Cemetery